Footscray is an inner-city suburb in Melbourne, Victoria, Australia,  west of Melbourne's Central Business District, located within the City of Maribyrnong local government area.

Footscray is characterised by a very diverse, multicultural central shopping area, which reflects the successive waves of immigration experienced by Melbourne, and by Footscray in particular. Once a centre for Greek, Italian and former Yugoslavian migrants, it later became a hub for Vietnamese and East African immigrants in Melbourne. It has recently begun to undergo rapid development and gentrification, and Time Out magazine placed Footscray at 13th in its '50 Coolest Neighbourhoods in the World' for 2019, reflecting its evolving reputation, citing in particular its diverse array of international cuisine, bars and nightlife, as well as its arts scene.

Footscray is named after Foots Cray, on the River Cray in London, England.

History

Footscray is part of the City of Maribyrnong and was built largely on the traditional lands of the Kulin nation.

For thousands of years, Footscray was the meeting place of the lands of the Yalukit-willan, the Marin-balluk and the Wurundjeri. Koories stalked game, collected food and fished along the river junction, estuaries, swamps and lagoons. Within Melbourne's western region, the Marin-balug and Kurung-jand-balug clans of the Woiwurrung cultural group, and the Yalukit willam clan of the Boonwurrung cultural group shared the luscious resources around the Maribyrnong Valley.

The first European to visit the area was Charles Grimes in 1803. A park, where he landed, is named after him at Napier St.

In 1839 a punt (cable ferry) was built on the Maribyrnong River, it was the only connecting link between Melbourne and Geelong, Ballarat, Castlemaine and Bendigo. The Punt Hotel opened three years later and was the first building in the area.  During the first decade drovers transporting cattle and sheep provided the only business at the hotel. After 1851, when gold was discovered out west, the pub did a roaring trade with diggers. Part of the old pub still stands and it has been renamed The Pioneer.  (Ref: Charlie Lovett's Footscray)

The Post Office first opened on 12 October 1857.

Footscray was declared a municipality in 1859 with a population of 300 and 70 buildings. Around the same year the first bridge was built across Saltwater (now Maribyrnong) River. (Ref: Charlie Lovett's Footscray)

Between 1881 and 1891 Footscray's population more than tripled from almost 6,000 to 19,000. (Ref: Charlie Lovett's Footscray)

Footscray developed into an industrial zone in the second half of the nineteenth century, with the manufacturing industry beginning to decline in the 1960s and 70s.

The Footscray Magistrates' Court closed on 1 February 1985.

People

Footscray was home to the Aboriginal Woiwurrung and Boonwurrung tribes of the Kulin nation.

In 2011, Footscray's 13,193 residents came from 135 countries.

In 2006 less than half the population (41.1%) was born in Australia, the main countries of overseas origin are Vietnam, China, India, United Kingdom and Italy. In the 21st Century, Maribyrnong of which Footscray is a part, saw a major increase in residents from Sudan, Ethiopia, Somalia, Bangladesh, Sri Lanka and Myanmar, including a large proportion of refugees.

Footscray has Victoria's fourth-highest proportion of residents born in South-East Asia (13.9%).

As of 2013, the average age of people living in Footscray was 33.

Maribyrnong Council predicts a population boom will more than double Footscray resident numbers from 14,100 to 30,500 by 2031, requiring about 7000 new dwellings.

Politics

Footscray falls within the federal electorate of Gellibrand (currently held by Tim Watts from the ALP) and the state electorate of Footscray (currently held by the ALP's Katie Hall), and the City of Maribyrnong at local level ( 2020 election: 3 Labor, 1 Independent, 2 Green, 1 Socialist councillors). The suburb's historical voting patterns have been fairly typical of a working-class suburb with a high migrant population. Footscray is a very safe state ALP seat, 65% of the vote went to Labor at the 2014 State election.

Consistent with other inner-city electorates in Melbourne, and other state capitals, voter support for the Australian Greens has increased in recent years; the Greens received 17 per cent of the primary vote in Footscray at the 2014 State Election. One third of voters at the Central Footscray booth voted for the Australian Greens in the 2010 Federal election, almost doubling the Greens vote in one election cycle.

At the Federal Election of 2010, the ALP won Gellibrand, which includes Footscray, with 59% of the vote. The Lib/Nat parties got 23%, whilst The Greens saw a swing of +6% with 15% of the vote.

Janet Rice of The Greens was elected to Maribyrnong Council in 2003, re-elected in 2005 and then elected mayor in 2006. Whilst Mayor, Janet had a Mayoral bike instead of a car.

The first Vietnamese woman mayor was Mai Ho, from 1997 to 1998. Mai Ho arrived in Australia in December 1982 with two small daughters and sixteen dollars. By 1997 she was Mayor of Maribyrnong. Twelve months later her daughter, Tan Le, was voted Young Australian of the Year.

Food

In 2013, there were over 130 restaurants in Footscray, including; 30 Vietnamese, 20 Indian, 17 Chinese and several others featuring African, Australian, Indonesian, Italian, Thai, Turkish and Japanese cuisines. Subway and Nandos are the only multi-national corporate food outlets in central Footscray.

Notable restaurants include the Station Hotel, the winner of radio 3AW's "Pub of the Year" award.

The Footscray Market is a large indoor fresh produce and seafood market, with 33 food stalls and 50 general stalls, catering particularly to the various ethnicities and local restaurants. It is located opposite Footscray railway station.

The Melbourne Wholesale Market on Footscray Road (often referred to as the Footscray Traders Market) moved to Epping in 2015.

Another large market in Footscray was Little Saigon, which opened in 1992 to cater to Asian population growth, but had customers from all backgrounds. Little Saigon was noisy and crowded, with a wide array of tropical fruits and Asian produce. However, this market was destroyed in a large fire on 13 December 2016, with more than $12 million worth of damage. As of 2021, there are plans to rebuild the market.

Culture
Footscray has some fine 1930s Art Deco buildings, most in disrepair and hidden behind shop signs and awnings.

The former Footscray Town Hall is the only American Romanesque civic building in Victoria. The outside is a mix of Art Deco, Moderne, Celtic, Spanish and Medieval.

Footscray Park is one of the largest and most intact examples of an Edwardian park in Australia; characteristic features include rustic stonework, ornamental ponds and extensive use of palms. The 15-hectare park is classified as a heritage place on the Victorian Heritage Register. The 'heavily indebted' local Council approved a 1.8 million makeover for the park in March 2011. In 2019, Council failed to privatise one third of the park.

In popular culture
Footscray has been the setting of several Australian movies.

In 1992, the film Romper Stomper was set in and filmed in and around Footscray. It deals with a fictional gang of neo-Nazi skinheads and their battle against Vietnamese immigrants. Not all scenes were filmed locally: the "Footscray Railway Station" featured in the movie has a pedestrian underpass, while the real station has an overpass for foot traffic; the actual station used for filming was Richmond Station.

The 1994 film Metal Skin and the 2015 film Pawno are also set in and around Footscray.

The song Footscray Station by Melbourne band Camp Cope is about Footscray, where the lead singer and guitarist Georgia Maq, originally from Kew, resides.

Australian pop punk outfit Nö Class frequently reference Footscray in their lyrics, such as their 2018 hit Carry Me Home, which centres around the legendary establishment the Footscray Hotel.

Melbourne band The Smith Street Band recorded the music video for their song 'Shine' as a homage to that of the music video of Its a Long Way to the Top (If You Wanna Rock 'n' Roll) by  iconic Australian band AC/DC in the CBD of Footscray along Barkly Street.

Groups

Asylum Seeker Resource Centre on Nicholson Street gives aid, welfare and medical care for thousands of asylum seekers.

The Australian Croatian Association headquarters is located in Footscray, serving the large Croatian Community in the area. Other Ethnic Community, Migrants and Refugees groups include African, Albanian, Burmese, Chinese, Croatian or Bosnian, Ethiopian, Filipino, Greek, Harari, Hungarian, Italian, Macedonian, Multicultural, Polish, Russian, Spanish and Latin American, Sudanese and Vietnamese.

The Footscray Club is a social club that has been part of Footscray since 1894. This was the original Footscray Cycle Club, when cycling became quite popular in Australia in the 19th century. By 1909 the club had built a permanent site on Paisley Street where it still stands today. Early in the last century the club evolved into a purely local social club where members of the local community meet and socialise to this day.

The Footscray Historical Society works on a number of local fronts to record and preserve the history of the area. The Society has an active membership who take part in a range of activities to assist this endeavour. Records such as rare books, business records and correspondence are held at the Society's headquarters at Ercildoune, built in 1876 as a branch of the National Bank of Australasia. The Society owns this historic building and has had the interior and exterior restored. Tours, forums and discussions are held regularly.

Footscray is at the centre of the Kariwara Scout district of Scouts Australia. The word 'Kariwara' means 'West' in a local Aboriginal dialect. Started in 1909, the 1st Footscray Scout hall is a historic building next to the Footscray Police Station in Hyde Street. 3rd Footscray is the hall seen from the railway line and no longer has youth programs but is home to adult training. The 2nd Footscray Scout hall has a modern brick hall after the first hall burnt down in 1982. The group has programs for children aged 7 to 26 and meets at Guadion Park in Barkly Street. The 10th Footscray Scout group is in Essex Street next to the YMCA and has programs for 7- to 15-year-olds. The 5th Footscray group is opposite Seddon railway station and has programs for 6- to 15-year-olds. All are part of Scouts Australia.

Maribyrnong Truck Action Group and Less Trucks For Moore work towards cleaning the air in Footscray and surrounding suburbs.

Other groups include; Footscray Traders Association, Footscray Asian Business Association, Save Railway Place, Footscray Sings Fair Go for Footscray Rail Residents and Footscray Rotary.

Arts

In 2013 the City of Maribyrnong ran a competition for a $170,000 public art installation. The winning entry by artists Vicki Couzens, Maree Clarke and Jeph Neale features massive rock boulders which form a circle across the intersection at the southern end of the Footscray Mall, symbolising a coolamon or welcome bowl. The work was installed in June 2013.

Footscray Community Arts Centre (FCAC) is a centre for contemporary arts, community engagement, cultural development and multicultural arts. Since its establishment in 1974, it is estimated that over 2 million community members have visited FCAC or directly participated in one or more of its many events, initiatives, projects, workshops and programs.

Phoenix Youth Theatre opened in 2014 at Phoenix Youth Centre at 72 Buckley St, Footscray.

The historic Footscray Drill Hall is home to Women's Circus, founded 1991, and the world famous Snuff Puppets, founded 1992.

Music

Footscray has a rich history of music and brass bands, currently being home to the Footscray-Yarraville City Band – FYCB, which rehearses weekly and performs throughout the year locally, nationally and internationally. The FYCB conduct an annual Carols by Candlelight event each December in the Yarraville Gardens. They were the 2010 VBL State Champions.

The Hyde Street Youth Band. was established in 1928. The Hyde Street Youth Band contributed to the history of the region as the band played the official theme song for the Footscray Football Club (now the Western Bulldogs) while they were playing at the Whitten Oval. The FYCB is one of five A-Grade Brass bands in Victoria and has been successful in the National Championships.

JABULA! – An African Community Choir, and is run by Sudanese singer Ajak Kwai and percussionist Tawanda Gadzikwa. The choir brings together people from broad skill levels and diverse African heritages. The choir meets fortnightly on Saturdays at the Footscray Community Arts Centre.

Festivals

Emerge in the West 17 May 2015 in the City of Maribyrnong reveals emerging African arts, culture and small businesses that have been growing rapidly in Melbourne's West, marking the start of the week long Africa Day Celebrations in Melbourne.

Founded in 2011, this annual 'Emerge' event is an outcome of MAV's CCD program for emerging and refugee artists and communities, triggering the founding of the Australian-African Small Business Association in 2014 to represent the growing number of African restaurants and cafes in Melbourne's West.

The St Jerome's Laneway Festival is an annual block party held in partnership with the Footscray Community Arts Centre. 15,000 enjoyed the festival in 2015. More recently, the festival is held at Footscray Park.

The Western Bulldogs Community Festival and Family Day is held every summer on Whitten Oval.

Central Footscray Streets are closed for the all-day-long Chinese New Year celebrations organised by the Footscray Asian Business Association (FABA). The Quang Minh Tet Festival celebrations in neighbouring Braybrook were expanded.

The Big West started in 1997 under the name MAP (Maribyrnong Arts Project), it continued for two decades. In 2011 it was attended by over 37,000 people. The last Big West Festival was in November 2015. In July 2016 the Big West board announced a plan to destroy Big West. The local arts community then set up the Save Big West group and failed.

Town planning

The 'Liveable Melbourne' 2011 survey listed Footscray as the 37th-most-liveable suburb in Melbourne.

In 2008, the State Labor Government designated Footscray as one of six Central Activities Districts. Melbourne's CADs were given planning rules aimed at creating lively mixed use CBD-like districts. The area, according to the local mayor, 'would soon have the second-highest skyline outside the Melbourne CBD'.

Local Footscray real estate agent Darren Dean of Sweeney Estate Agents said one pocket of Footscray – bounded by Geelong Road, Ballarat Road, Victoria Street, the railway line and Moore Street – had been intended for "a mini Manhattan".

"There are cranes popping up in the skyline everywhere over here", he said.

Examples of new real estate developments in Footscray:

Ovation located at 94–104 Buckley Street, Footscray.
Liberty One located at 1 Warde Street, Footscray.
Live City located at 124–188 Ballarat Road, Footscray.
Eldridge located at 17 Eldridge Street Footscray.

Examples of the changing face of Footscray include:

In 2014, the Liberal State Planning Minister Matthew Guy approved a 28-story tower that will overshadow the Maribyrnong River in Footscray.
Nearly 9,000 additional dwellings were built in Footscray between 2006 and 2011.
Grocon opened the $350 million 'McNab Avenue Development' with residential apartments, Government and commercial offices in 2014.
The Banco Group turned the Footscray Plaza into a $45 million apartment block of ten stories, with the old retail space expanded. The property falls within the Priority Development Zone so there were no rights to community consultation.
As part of the Footscray City Edge master plan, Maribyrnong Council planned to turn the Paisley Street carpark into a park.
 In 2012, a $500million high-density residential and commercial development was approved for over the railway tracks near Footscray Station.
In 2011, the iconic Little Saigon market was approved for a $70 million redevelopment with twin towers, holding 260 apartments and sky gardens.
The 15-hectare 'Joseph Road Precinct' was approved for higher-density residential development in 2009. The tallest building approved for the area is a $90 million, 25-story apartment block with 222 apartments, construction is due to finish in 2013.
A new $6 billion suburb called E-Gate in West Melbourne has been proposed by the state government on a 20-hectare site along Footscray Road.
The long-abandoned Kinnears rope factory site on Ballarat Road could be turned into a mini-suburb for 2,500 people including high-rise apartments, increasing the number of homes in Footscray by more than a quarter.
In 2011, $2 million was spent to revamp Leeds Street with wider footpaths, more trees and less access for cars.
In 2010, as a part of the Victorian Government's $61.6 million Footscray renewal program, a new $15 million rail footbridge opened at Footscray railway station; within months, the government announced that half of the bridge would need to be rebuilt to accommodate new platforms for the Regional Rail Link. Ken Betts, local Liberal candidate says, "the railway station is a complete an utter mess", The canopies on the footbridge have designer holes which allows the rain fall through, leaving the steep steps and flat surface of the bridge covered in slippery water, which ex-Mayor of Maribyrnong, Janet Rice, calls unsafe.
The landscape of Footscray station was upgraded significantly as a result of the Regional Rail Link from 2012 to 2014. Works included:

 2 new platforms, numbered 1 and 2, for the Sunbury line Metro services. These were completed in January 2014.
 A brand new ticket office and waiting area, located near the bus interchange on Irving St near the new Platform 1. Completed along with Platform 1 & 2 in January 2014.
 The escalators at the Hyde and Irving Street ends were upgraded significantly, with new lifts and shelters added to both and the Irving Street end of the William Cooper Footbridge was extended out to accommodate the new RRL platforms. Four wide ramps were also added looking toward the Nicholson St & McNab Av side of the station, to navigate between the street and the footbridge and the platforms and the footbridge.
 The former Platforms 1, 2, 3 and 4 were renumbered 3, 4, 5 and 6, with 1 & 2 being closed for construction of the new RRL tracks. These were completed in July 2014.
 Extensive restoration of historic buildings was carried out
 A forecourt with plants and sitting areas was built where shops had formerly been on Irving Street, and 2 new kiosks were constructed close to the station entrance. The most famous of these was the Olympic Hot Doughnuts (now closed) kiosk, with an opening day being held on 9 July 2014 and former premier Denis Napthine being in attendance.

All works at Footscray station were complete by November 2014.

Transport issues in Footscray:

Despite the revamping of Footscray, 1,000s of heavy trucks from nearby ports use the suburbs streets. Almost 3,000 trucks a day were recorded going down Buckley Street in central Footscray in 2010. Greens Mayor Cr Janet Rice helped get heavy trucks banned from Hopkins, Barkley, Irving, and Nicholson Streets in 2007. Truck bypass protesters from the MTAG have blockaded central Footscray roads during peak hour several times, the last blockade was on Moore St, April 2014.  Protestors called for night and weekend truck curfews.

The West Gate Distributor (Northern Section) will be part of a planned multimillion-dollar truck tollway between the port and the Westgate freeway, construction of the Northern section is expected to commence late in 2015 and take approximately 18 months to complete. This was later to become known as the West Gate Tunnel (formally the Western Distributor), currently under construction and expected to be complete by 2024.
Between 2011 and 2012 a multimillion-dollar planning study was conducted into building a multibillion-dollar tunnel under Footscray. The tunnel is part of a proposed East West Link toll road, in May 2013 the State Liberal Government pledged $300 million towards the eastern suburbs section of the $8 billion project. Contracts were later signed, however in June 2015 the Andrews Government opted to cancel them. As of August 2020 the project has still not proceeded.
Between 2009 and 2012 the former State Labor Government conducted route investigations and consultation to help identify options for removing trucks from local streets under the name  'Truck Action Plan', in August 2012 the ruling Liberal Government put this on hold and in May 2013 the plan was finally scrapped as the government claims it has been superseded by east–west link plans.
The Maribyrnong Truck Action Group blockaded Shepherd Bridge in March 2013, demanding the state government fast-track work on linking the port with the West Gate Freeway.
In 2013, the State and Federal Government is spending $5 Million dollars investigating the possibility of a new interstate freight terminal in Truganina, which would reduce the daily number of trucks in the inner west from 20,000 to 18,000.
Footscray railway station is the busiest non-CBD railway station in Melbourne, with 14,000 boardings per day.
The $5 Billion Regional Rail Link, took out 26 homes and 84 businesses in Central Footscray. and will create slower travel times between Geelong and Melbourne, not faster. The Regional Rail Link rebuilt the Nicholson Street bridge in central Footscray, all the shops and cafes on this bridge were destroyed, and foot-traffic is now exposed to the diesel trains below.
In 2008 the Melbourne City Council recommended extending the 86 tram route to Footscray via Docklands.

Community initiatives

Grasslands Organic Grocery is a non-profit community initiative, established in 1997. All the produce is certified organic/biodynamic; free of animal ingredients; minimally processed/packaged; healthy to use; affordable; locally made; produced by small enterprises that have good working conditions and who are not involved in other unethical or unsustainable practices. Concession card holds get a discount when buying in store, currently only open on Thursdays.

Sport

Aussie Rules Football

Footscray is home of the Western Bulldogs Australian rules football club, which play in the Australian Football League. The team was formerly known as the Footscray Football Club until 1996, and played its home games at the Whitten Oval on Barkly Street, on the edge of Footscray. In 2014, competitive football returned to the club's home base with the re-introduction of the Footscray Bulldogs into the Victorian Football League (VFL) competition, who won the 2016 premiership. In addition, Footscray is also represented in the Western Region Football League by the West Footscray Roosters, the North Footscray Devils and the Parkside Magpies.

Basketball

Footscray Hawks Basketball Club – after a decade break this club, once the biggest in Victoria, returned in 2011.

Canoeing
 Footscray Canoe Club, located at 40 Farnsworth Ave (corner of Maribyrnong Boulevard). Sessions usually run on Saturday or Sunday from 7.30am.

Cricket

The Footscray Edgewater Cricket Club (formerly Footscray Cricket Club) was founded in 1883 and for the first 113 years of its existence was also located at the Western Oval (now Whitten Oval) until 1996 when combined pressure exerted by the Footscray Football Club and state-government-appointed commissioners to the City of Maribyrnong saw the club relocated to the Mervyn G. Hughes Oval. Until the test cricket debut of the Melbourne Cricket Club's Brad Hodge in December 2005, the Footscray Cricket Club had produced the most Test players of any Melbourne based district cricket club. Footscray's Test representatives in order of debut are Ron Gaunt, Les Joslin, Ken Eastwood, Alan Hurst, Ray Bright, Merv Hughes, Tony Dodemaide and Colin Miller. The club won its only District First Eleven premiership under the captaincy of Lindsay James in 1979/80.
The Footscray United Cricket Club was founded in 1934 and won the VTCA North A1 Grand Final for 2010–11.

Cycling

The Footscray Cycling Club promotes road racing and criterium racing, whilst cyclists are represented by the MazzaBUG, the Maribyrnong Bicycle User Group.
Nearby bike paths include the Maribyrnong River Trail and the Hobsons Bay Coastal Trail.

Football (Soccer)

The football club Melbourne Croatia was founded in Leeds Street, Footscray in 1953, and now bears the name Melbourne Knights FC.
Footscray JUST was a soccer club which played at Schintler Reserve.

Gridiron (American Football)

Footscray is home of the Western Crusaders, an American football or Gridiron team which plays in the Gridiron Victoria league. The team was known as the Westside Vikings until 1997, and plays its home games at the Henry Turner Memorial Reserve on Farnsworth Avenue right next door to the iconic Flemington Racecourse, within the Footscray Park area, Maribyrnong River and Victoria University. The Western Crusaders proudly call Footscray its home.

Gyms
 Apollo Gym: Hardcore gym in industrial warehouse at 37/91 Moreland St, Footscray – one of the nation's first gyms, opened in the 1930s
 The Exercise Room:  24 Hour Gym with after-hours swipe card entry. 88 Buckley Street Footscray  
 White Dog Studio: Pilates, Yoga, meditation and High intensity Fitness training. 34 Moreland Street, Footscray

Gymnastics
 Footscray City Gymnastics Club: The 30-year-old club is home to almost 900 gymnasts and now offers programs to children with disabilities.

Hockey

Footscray Hockey Club (Junior): Run by 90 volunteers, the club is the second-largest hockey club in Melbourne, with playing members from five to 70 years old and a focus on equality for female players.

Horse Racing

Flemington Racecourse, the home of the Melbourne Cup, is across the Maribyrnong River to the northeast in the neighbouring suburb of Flemington, immediately opposite Footscray Park, the second largest botanical garden in Victoria.

Lacrosse 
 The Footscray Lacrosse Club is 50 years old and play at Angliss Reserve in Yarraville. In 2011 the club has around 190 members across 15 Men and Women teams.

Martial Arts 
A.I.M. Academy Headquarters, specialising in martial arts, self-defence and fitness programs for teens and adults, at 201 Barkly Street, Footscray. Opened in 2010.
 Resilience Training Centre runs judo, Brazilian jiu-jitsu (BJJ) and CrossFit training classes for people at all levels of experience, at 86 Buckley Street, Footscray.

Rowing

Footscray City Rowing Club – This club is over 100 years old and meets at the Footscray Boat Club, Maribyrnong Boulevard. The club is for 14-year-olds and up, beginners, novices, seniors and school programs.

Rugby
 Footscray Rugby Union Club – formed in 1928 and one of the oldest rugby clubs south of the (NSW) border. Footscray RUC has produced 5 Wallabies (Australian national team players), 1 current Wallaroo (Australian national women's team player) and currently plays in the Premier Division of the Victorian Rugby Union. Their home ground is the Dodemaide Oval in Footscray Park, in front of the Vic Uni Ballarat Road campus. The club has men-, women- and junior teams and the players come from a very diverse background. Every year several international students join the club for the duration of their stay. Like many sports clubs in Footscray, the club colours are red, white and blue and the club emblem is a bulldog.

Swimming
 A public swimming pool and gym could form part of a 2014 proposed $12 million redevelopment of Whitten Oval.

Water Polo
 Footscray Swimming & Waterpolo Club – formed in 1909 and commenced activities in the Maribyrnong River, then the Footscray Swim Centre.

Industry
While many factories and warehouses are still to be found in and around the suburb of Footscray, many former industrial sites are being transformed into modern housing estates. Perhaps the largest of these is the former Footscray Ammunition Factory in a prime elevated position overlooking the banks of the Maribyrnong River with views across to Flemington Racecourse and the Melbourne city centre.

The eastern portion of Footscray, in the fork between the Yarra River and Maribyrnong River, contains railway yards, Appleton and Swanson Docks which were the site of the 1998 Australian waterfront dispute and the Melbourne Wholesale Fruit and Vegetable Market. The market houses 400 businesses, employs 3000 people and supplies 60 per cent of Victoria's fresh produce, it is due to move to Epping in 2013–14. In 2005, the State Government announced the closure of the Melbourne Wholesale Fruit and Vegetable Market to make way for an extensive redevelopment of the Port of Melbourne and the construction of new freight rail links to the area.

The headquarters of Lonely Planet Publications were located in eastern Footscray on the banks of the Maribyrnong River, adjacent to the Hobsons Bay Coastal Trail. Lonely Planet has published over 100 million books and in 2013 the BBC sold Lonely Planet to an American company for $75 Million. The headquarters were moved to Carlton in 2016, with the space taken over by coworking space The Dream Factory.

Notable residents

 Bangs (born 1990), South Sudanese-Australian hip hop artist.
 Ray Borner (born 1962), former basketballer and Olympian.
 Coral Browne (1913–1991), International award-winning film and theatre actor who was raised in Footscray.
 Doug Chappel, Comedian.
 William Cooper (1861–1941), Aboriginal rights leader, in 1938 organised the only protest in the world against Kristallnacht. Trees have been planted in Jerusalem in his honour and the footbridge at Footscray Station bears his name.
 Russell Gilbert (born 1959), TV and film comedian, twice Logie nominated during his nine years on the Hey Hey It's Saturday TV show.
 Merv Hughes (born 1961), former Australian cricketer, played in 53 Test matches, now retired with Mervyn G. Hughes Oval named after him.
 Michael Leunig (born 1945), cartoonist, poet and an Australian Living Treasure.
 Colin Miller (born 1964), former Australian test cricketer.
 Ernie Sigley (1938–2021), former TV presenter and radio compare and TV Week Gold Logie Award winner.
 Les Twentyman, youth worker and social campaigner who has received the Order of Australia and was the 2006 Victorian of the Year.
 Sarah Watt (1958–2011), was an Australian filmmaker, best known for two feature films Look Both Ways and My Year Without Sex. She was a long-time resident of Footscray.
 Ted Whitten (1933–1995), Hall of Fame footballer and TV personality. A life size statue of 'Mr Football' kicking a ball stands outside Whitten Oval on Barkly Street.
 Queenie Williams (1896–1962), actress, dancer, vaudeville performer

Educational institutions

Childcare Centres and Kindergartens
Angliss Children's Centre – Corner of Vipont Street & Seelaf Square.
Brenbeal Children's Centre – 8 Rayner Street, Footscray.
Hyde Street Kindergarten – 10a Hyde Street, Footscray.
Kingsville Kindergarten – Hansen Reserve, Roberts Street, Footscray.
Bulldogs Community Child Care Centre – 19 Hocking Street, Footscray.
The Learning Sanctuary Footscray - 398 Barkly Street, Footscray 

Primary
 Footscray City Primary School. The State Government is closing the Steiner stream in 2012.
Footscray North Primary School, corner Rosamond Rd and Mephan Street, Footscray.
Footscray Primary School, previously known as Geelong Road Primary, offers the International Baccalaureate, and Vietnamese Bilingual Programme.
St. John's Catholic Primary School, 90% of the Students are from non-English-speaking backgrounds. The 'My School' website revealed that year 5 students at St John's outperformed their peers at Geelong Grammar School in four out of the five NAPLAN tests, which assess reading, writing, spelling, grammar and punctuation, and numeracy.
St Monica's Primary School, a Catholic school with around 170 children, big on English Literacy.

Secondary
 Footscray High School – Kinnear Campus. Opened in May 1980 as Footscray Technical School, after the school moved from the original site in Ballarat Rd, that opened in 1916. The name was changed to Footscray City Secondary College in 1989, and later to Footscray City College. Co-Ed, 1000 students, VCE, TAFE and more offered.
Originally Footscray Technical School offered years 7–11, but went onto to offer years 7–12. With the change to the Kinnear Campus as part of the Footscray Learning Precinct initiative, it will offer years 8–12 from 2020, before moving to years 10–12 only by 2022.

Universities
 Victoria University, Footscray Park, a seven-hectare site, swimming pool and gym open to the public.
 Victoria University, Footscray Nicholson, range of TAFE programs.

Institutes and more
 Austwide Institute of Training, Automotive Management Institute.
 Leonie Khoury School of Music, lessons for Flute, Clarinet, Saxophone, Piano and Violin.
Footscray City Films, independent Tertiary Institution offering Certificate IV, Diplomas and Advanced Diplomas in Screen and Media. Over 120 Short Films are produced each year.

Neighbourhood Houses
 Angliss Neighbourhood House Registered training provider delivering adult, community and further education programs and vocational training

Public libraries

The Footscray Public Library is operated by the Maribyrnong City Council. Services include 'story time' for pre-schoolers, orientation tours, reference and information services to assist with research needs, internet classes, and services for those unable to visit the library. Facilities include public internet, word processing, photocopiers, study carrels, local studies/family history room, conference and discussion rooms, a baby change room and community notice boards. The library is open 7 days (closed public holidays).

The Footscray Mechanics' Institute Inc. was established in 1856, and has operated a library since its inception. The current FMI Library has been located at 209 Nicholson Street since 1913. The library is a private subscription library, which is open 3 days a week Weds-Thurs-Fri 10am – 4pm, closed for Weekends, Public Holidays and for 3–4 weeks over the Christmas/New Year period.

Health

The health needs of Footscray and surrounding residents are served by the Western General Hospital or WHF. The Western General is a large teaching and research hospital responsible for providing a comprehensive range of inpatient and outpatient acute health services. The hospital currently conducts research in gastroenterology, colorectal cancer, emergency care, oncology, respiratory medicine, sleep disorders, and vascular surgery.

Key services at the Western Hospital include acute medical and surgical services, intensive and coronary care, emergency services, renal services, specialist drug and alcohol services, aged care and palliative care. The hospital also serves as one of the teaching campuses for the University of Melbourne's medical program.

The Western Region Health Centre was established in 1964. Services include an African community worker, refugee health nurse, women's health nurse, dieticians, youth health nurse, diabetic educator, podiatrist, counsellors and physiotherapists. Visiting specialists include a general surgeon and paediatrician. Pathology services and dental services are co-located on site.

Places of worship

60% of Footscray residences admitted to belonging to a religion in 2011, down from 70% in 2006. There are many religious organisations and places of worship in Footscray, including Anglican, Assemblies of God, Baptist, Buddhist, Catholic, Church of Christ, Evangelical Christian, Independent Christian, Lutheran, Muslim, Orthodox, Pentecostal, Presbyterian and Uniting Church.

The Heavenly Queen Temple, the largest temple of the Chinese sea-goddess Mazu in Australia, is being built on the banks of the river. Its grounds include a  gold statue.

Media

Two free suburban weekly newspapers are delivered in Footscray on Wednesdays:

The  Maribyrnong Leader (formerly the Western Times) is published by Leader Community Newspapers and owned by News Corporation.
The Maribyrnong & Hobsons Bay Star Weekly is published by Metro Media Publishing, which is owned by Fairfax and the Star News Group.
Historical newspapers:
The Independent was a weekly newspaper published from 1883 to 1933.
The Advertiser (1874–1982); (1914–1918 available via Trove), whose origins may be traced back to 1859.

See also
 City of Footscray – Footscray was previously within this former local government area.
 Electoral district of Footscray
 Romper Stomper, an Australian film set in Footscray.

References

External links

 Australian Croatian Association Melbourne
 Footscray Club social club, on Paisley Street
 Footscray Community Arts Centre
 Footscray Cycling Club
 Footscray Historical Society on Vicnet
 Footscray-Yarraville City Band
 Maribyrnong City Council
 Melbourne Museum of Printing on Vicnet
 Snuff Puppets theatre group
 Western Crusaders Gridiron Club
 Quang Minh Buddhist Centre
 Footscray Suburb Map
 The Footscray $750 million regeneration project 
 New Real Estate Developments in Footscray

Suburbs of Melbourne
Suburbs of the City of Maribyrnong